Storefront Lawyers (also known as Men at Law) is an American legal drama that ran from September 1970 to January 1971 and February 1971 to March 1971 on CBS. The series starred Robert Foxworth, Sheila Larken, David Arkin, and A Martinez.

Plot
David Hansen (Foxworth) is a big-shot lawyer who grew tired of his important and expensive Los Angeles law firm Horton, Troy, McNeil, & Caroll. Hansen left his job to start a non-profit firm called Neighborhood Legal Services based in Century City, California. His associates were Deborah Sullivan (Larken) and Gabriel Kay (Arkin). Roberto (Martinez) is a law student who worked for them as a clerk.

After 13 weeks, CBS decided to take the series in a different direction so that the lawyers could take on rich clients as well. The network retitled the series as Men at Law as the three protagonists went back to work for their former law firm.

Cast

Main
 Robert Foxworth as David Hansen
 Sheila Larken as Deborah Sullivan
 David Arkin as Gabriel Kaye
 A Martinez as Roberto Alvarez

Recurring
 Gerald S. O'Loughlin as Devlin McNeil

Episodes

Reception

Critical response
In the book, The Cultural Lives of Cause Lawyers edited by Austin Sarat and Stuart Scheingold, "The Storefront Lawyers featured two men and one woman, all WASPS, but the presence of a woman was a departure at the time when women still constituted less than five percent of the profession." "The Storefront Lawyers emphasizes that passivity, suggesting lawyers do nothing unless called upon. Given anxiety over lawyers trolling for clients, this portrayal suggests there is nothing to worry about. From the viewer's perspective such things simply do not happen."

In his Time magazine interview, critic Richard Burgheim lumped the new CBS legal series together with another of the network's bids at "revelvance," noting "The Storefront Lawyers (CBS) and The Interns (CBS) both exploit Mod Squads multihero angle, but neither one is genuinely mod or engrossing."

References

Citations

Sources

External links
 

1970 American television series debuts
1971 American television series endings
American legal drama television series
CBS original programming
English-language television shows
Television series by CBS Studios
Television shows set in Los Angeles